If... Dog... Rabbit..., also known as One Last Score, is a 1999 American crime drama thriller film written, directed by and starring Matthew Modine, in his feature film debut as a director.  It also stars John Hurt, Kevin J. O'Connor, Bruce Dern, David Keith and Lisa Marie.

Plot
Johnnie Cooper (Modine), fresh out of prison for armed robbery, finds work at a gas station to try to start a new life. His parole officer, Gilmore (Keith), lets Cooper's father Sean (Hurt), who he strongly suspects was also involved in the robbery, know about his release because of good behavior. Johnnie later calls his home where his brother Jamie (O'Connor) answers. Jamie and his girlfriend Judy (Marie) visit Johnnie and invite him home for a barbecue. Johnnie's boss (Dern) encourages Johnnie to go after work. It is learned that Johnnie, Jamie, and their father were all involved in the heist that got Johnnie in prison. After getting into a fight with his father, who is revealed to have left Johnnie behind to the cops on their last heist, Johnnie goes to a bar with Jamie and Judy. When Jamie tries to rob some Mexican drug dealers, and they fight him back, Johnnie intervenes, accidentally killing one of the Mexicans. Johnnie, Jamie and Judy all drive away.

The next morning, Gilmore arrives at the Johnnie's workplace, having heard about the incident, to interrogate Johnnie about where he was last night. Being convinced that Johnnie was at his family's barbecue, Gilmore starts to leave, but Jamie, afraid of going to jail, knocks him out over the head with a wooden board. Freaking out, Johnnie takes Gilmore to the hospital, and later goes on the run with Jamie, and tells Judy to stay in town to not get involved.

Johnnie takes Jamie, who is convinced that Gilmore is dead, along to work at a tortilla factory owned by a Mexican friend, Villalobos, in Tijuana, to hide out for a few months. While working there for several weeks, which makes Jamie uneasy, they conspire with another long-time employee, Cesar (Palomino), to pull off a heist at a bullring to finally get out of Tijuana. Gilmore, who has been recovering from his injury, searches for Johnnie and Jamie by interrogating different people, including Judy. This worries Judy, who later tries to find Jamie in Tijuana and inform him and Johnnie about how Gilmore isn't really dead. Johnnie tries to send Judy away, but she is later kidnapped by the Mexican drug dealers from the beginning when they recognize Johnnie working at the tortilla factory and see her there.

Villalobos and Sean eventually discover the scheme the brothers and Cesar are planning at the bullring and want to be part of it. Johnnie tries to get out of it all when he learns Gilmore survived the blow to the head, but Sean convinces him to stay and help out. While going through with their plan, Judy is tortured by her abductors until she reveals Jamie's heist plans. The dealers go to find Jamie in retribution for the killing of one of their men, and Judy escapes from them and tries to get to Jamie before they do. While Johnnie and Cesar are robbing the cashiers at the bullring, Jamie gets their getaway car ready to go to the beach, where Sean is supposed to be waiting for them all on a speedboat. Judy arrives at the bullring to reunite with Jamie, but the drug dealers also arrive. As Johnnie and Cesar try to get into the getaway car, a shootout ensues with the drug dealers, which catches the attention of the bullring guards, who also get involved. In the ensuing gunfight, Judy, Jamie, Cesar, and some of the dealers are killed, and Johnnie tries to get away with the money to the beach. The guards call the police to help catch Johnnie. When Sean sees Johnnie arriving with the money, but with some policemen on his heels, he uses the speedboat to escape, leaving Johnnie behind again to be arrested for the robbery.

The film ends with a flashback where as kids, Johnnie is explaining to Jamie the art of theft.

Cast
Matthew Modine as Johnnie Cooper
John Hurt as Sean Cooper
Lisa Marie as Judy
Bruce Dern as McGurdy
David Keith as Parole Officer Gilmore
Kevin J. O'Connor as Jamie Cooper
Carlos Palomino as Cesar
Susan Traylor as Lulu 
Julie Newmar as Judy's Mother

Reception
Christopher Null of Contactmusic.com gave the film two and a half stars out of five.

References

External links
 
 

1990s English-language films
1990s Spanish-language films
American crime thriller films
American crime drama films
American thriller drama films
Franchise Pictures films
1999 directorial debut films
Films produced by Elie Samaha
1990s American films